The Battle of Sulphur Creek Trestle, also known as the Battle of Athens,  was fought near Athens, Alabama (Limestone County, Alabama), from September 23 to 25, 1864 as part of the American Civil War.

In September 1864, General Nathan Bedford Forrest led his force into northern Alabama and middle Tennessee to disrupt the supply of William Tecumseh Sherman's army in Georgia.

The battle's site was listed on the National Register of Historic Places in 1973.

Athens (September 23–24) 

On the afternoon of 23 September, Union forces engaged Confederate forces five miles south of Athens, near Tanner, where they were destroying a railroad trestle.  Forrest's Confederate forces moved towards Athens. That evening the Confederate forces gained control of the town, and the Union forces had retreated within Fort Henderson.

The Confederate forces began an artillery barrage on the morning of the 24th.  In a personal meeting, Forrest convinced the Union commander, Colonel Wallace Campbell, that the Confederate forces numbered 8,000-10,000.  Campbell surrendered the fort and its garrison
around noon.

Shortly after the garrison had surrendered, reinforcements consisting of about 350 men from the 18th Michigan and 102nd Ohio, commanded by Jonas Elliott, arrived by train from Decatur.  After suffering casualties of one-third their total personnel, these forces surrendered.

Sulphur Creek Trestle (September 25)  

After defeating the Union forces in Athens, Forrest moved north along the railroad with the intent to destroy a strategic trestle at Sulphur Creek, six miles north of Athens.  A fortification, two blockhouses, and a force of 1,000 Union soldiers defended the trestle.

On the morning of the 25th, the Confederate forces began an artillery bombardment of the fort.  The fortification had been built below the summits of adjacent hills, and thus provided little defense against the bombardment. 200 Union soldiers were killed, including the
commander, Colonel William Hopkins Lathrop. By noon, George Spalding had surrendered the remaining 800 soldiers. There were no reported Confederate losses.

Aftermath 

The Union prisoners were transferred to Confederate prisons. Many of these prisoners died on April 27, 1865, when the steamboat Sultana sank while transporting them home.

Notes

References
  20th (Russell's) Tennessee Cavalry, CSA
 Update to the Civil War Sites Advisory Commission Report on the Nation's Civil War Battlefields - State of Alabama
 
 http://ehistory.osu.edu/osu/sources/recordView.cfm?Content=077/0514
 Limestone County Historical Society, Historical Marker Text for "Battle of Sulphur Creek Trestle". http://www.marker.limestonecountyhistoricalsociety.org/html/sulphur_battle.html. Erected 1982.
 Limestone County Historical Society. Historical Marker for "Fort Henderson", http://www.marker.limestonecountyhistoricalsociety.org/html/ft_henderson.html. Erected 2002.
 Greater Limestone County Chamber of Commerce, "Athens-Limestone County Civil War Trail: Self Guided Driving Tour Featuring the Battles of Athens & Sulphur Creek Trestle", [www.tourathens.com], February 2010. https://web.archive.org/web/20110109114558/http://tourathens.com/wp-content/uploads/2008/12/civil-war-trail-single-pages-Feb-20101.pdf

1864 in the Confederate States of America
Sulphur Creek Trestle
Sulphur Creek Trestle
Sulphur Creek
Sulphur Creek
Limestone County, Alabama
Morgan County, Alabama
Giles County, Tennessee
Sulphur Creek Trestle
1864 in Alabama
1864 in Tennessee
Nathan Bedford Forrest
September 1864 events